Tetrarhanis baralingam, the Baralingam on-off, is a butterfly in the family Lycaenidae. It is found in Sierra Leone, Ivory Coast, southern Ghana and Liberia (Sapo National Park). Their habitat consists of primary forests.

References

Butterflies described in 1998
Poritiinae